The Nazimaruttash kudurru stone is a boundary stone (kudurru) of Nazimaruttaš, a Kassite king of Babylon, c. 1307–1282 BC (short chronology). It was found at Susa and is now displayed at the Louvre.

Some kudurrus are known for their portrayal of the king, etc., who consigned it. Most kudurrus portray Mesopotamian gods, which are often portrayed graphically in segmented registers on the stone. Nazimaruttash's kudurru does not use registers. Instead, graphic symbols are used. Nineteen deities are invoked to curse the foolhardy individual who seeks to desecrate it. Some are represented by symbols, such as a goat-fish for Enki or a bird on a pole for Papsukkal, a spear-head for Marduk or an eight-pointed star for Ishtar. Shamash is represented by a disc.

References

External links
Kudurru Image
Article discussing Nazimaruttaš Kudurru, (Boundary Stone). 

Archaeological discoveries in Iran
Kudurru boundary stones
Sculpture of the Ancient Near East
Near East and Middle East antiquities of the Louvre
Susa